L'Aventurier (The Adventurer) is the debut studio album of Indochine, a French pop rock band, released in 1982. The title itself "L'Aventurier" was a huge success during the same year, becoming one of the band's classic songs. The title track won the "Song of the Summer" of 1982 in France, while the disc itself also won the "Bus D'Acier" award for 1983. The song references the universe of Bob Morane.

Track listing
 L'Aventurier - 3.53
 L'Opportuniste - 2.26
 Leila - 3.56
 Docteur Love - 2.32
 Indochine (Les 7 Jours De Pékin) - 2.24
 Dizzidence Politik - 4.21
 Françoise (Qu'est-ce qui t'as pris?) - 2.36

References 

1982 debut albums
Indochine (band) albums